Joaquín García de Antonio [Sanchís] ( in Anna, Valencia – 15 September 1779 in Las Palmas) was a Valencian composer and maestro de capilla. His cantatas are in the Italian style but his villancicos adopt a purely Hispanic vernacular style.

References

1710 births
1779 deaths
18th-century composers
18th-century male musicians
18th-century musicians
Spanish male musicians